Water loss may refer to:
 Dehydration (disambiguation)
 Leakage of water, especially in water supply networks
s.a. Non-revenue water